"For You" is a song recorded by British singers Liam Payne and Rita Ora, for the soundtrack to the film Fifty Shades Freed (2018). It was released on 5 January 2018 through Universal Studios and Republic Records as the lead single from the soundtrack. The music video was released on 26 January 2018. The song was also included on Ora's second studio album, Phoenix (2018) and Payne's debut studio album, LP1 (2019).

"For You" reached the top ten in the United Kingdom, France, Norway, Switzerland, Austria, Portugal, Poland and Belgium, and peaked at number one in Germany.

Promotion
On 20 December 2017, both artists posted a promotional shot on social media of themselves standing together, dressed up to the nines, along with the hashtag "#FiftyShadesFreed". The picture started speculation on a possible collaboration between the two for the upcoming film Fifty Shades Freed, in which Ora appears. A day after, the pair released the first teaser of the song on social media. On 3 January 2018, they revealed the song's release date and released the second teaser, a video showing the studio session in which they recorded the song.

Critical reception
Lauren O'Neill of Vice called it "a fine song with a serviceable chorus", he disliked Payne's appearance on the track and wrote that it would be "entirely better if Rita, whose voice sounds very pretty here, had been left to her own devices". Patrick Hosken of MTV News wrote that "the song's opening blares immediately reminded me of Celine Dion's "My Heart Will Go On". Sam Damshenas of Gay Times deemed the song "a sultry synthpop duet" that is "catchy as f**k". He expect the song to be "a smash hit", considering how well the previous singles from Fifty Shades soundtrack albums have done. Kevin Goddard of HotNewHipHop described the song as "a sultry, steamy, upbeat and pop-driven dance record".

Rap-Up opined that the duet "combines upbeat harmonies with catchy melodies". Michelle Phi of Clevver wrote that "the upbeat dance tempo and sultry lyrics are the perfect combo to get any fan excited about the final installment of Fifty Shades of Grey" and the song "could be the steamiest song to grace the franchise yet". Similarly, Mike Vulpo of E! also regarded the song as "an upbeat dance number that may just get fans more pumped for the steamy movie hitting theatres before Valentine's Day".

Chart performance
"For You" peaked at number one in Germany, making it Payne and Ora's first song to top the chart in the country. The song charted within the top five in the charts of Austria, France, Portugal and Switzerland. The single also reached the top 10 in the UK, peaking at number eight, making it Payne's second top 10 in the country as a solo artist and Ora's twelfth.

Music video

The official music video of the song was released on 26 January 2018 on the Fifty Shades Vevo account. It was directed by Hannah Lux Davis. The filming took place at Oheka Castle on Long Island, off the coast of the eastern United States. It features Ora in a red dress walking and running in the garden and Payne in the castle, with them meeting on the grand staircase at the end. Special effects throughout also show the pair levitating. Comparisons were drawn to the video of "Blank Space" by Taylor Swift, as both videos were filmed in the same location.

Live performances
On 31 January 2018, Payne and Ora performed "For You" on The Tonight Show Starring Jimmy Fallon. They also sang on Today on 1 February, and on the French television show C à vous on 5 February. The duo also performed the song at the 2018 Brit Awards on 21 February 2018. On 12 April 2018, Payne and Ora performed the song live after Ora performed "Your Song" and "Anywhere" at the German Echo Music Prize. On 18 April 2020, Payne and Ora performed the song at One World: Together at Home.

Credits and personnel
Credits adapted from Tidal.

 Liam Payne – vocals, background vocals
 Rita Ora – vocals, background vocals
 Ali Payami – songwriting, production, background vocals, keyboard, bass, drums, horn, percussion, programming
 Ali Tamposi – songwriting, background vocals
 Andrew Watt – songwriting, production, background vocals, guitar
 Peter Karlsson – production, background vocals
 John Hanes – mix engineering
 Sam Holland – engineering
 Serban Ghenea – mixing
 Jakob Jerlström – background vocals
 Max Grahn – background vocals
 Cory Bice – assistant engineering
 Jeremy Lertola – assistant engineering
 Niklas Ljungfelt – guitar

Charts

Weekly charts

Year-end charts

Certifications

Release history

See also
 List of number-one hits of 2018 (Germany)
 List of number-one songs of 2018 (Lebanon)
 List of number-one songs of the 2010s (Czech Republic)

References

2018 songs
2018 singles
Liam Payne songs
Rita Ora songs
Songs written by Ali Payami
Songs written by Ali Tamposi
Synth-pop songs
Songs written by Andrew Watt (record producer)
Male–female vocal duets
Fifty Shades film music
Number-one singles in Germany
Music videos directed by Hannah Lux Davis